Rice Lake is a lake in Mille Lacs County, in the U.S. state of Minnesota.

Rice Lake was named for its wild rice which was a staple food of the Ojibwe Indians.

See also
List of lakes in Minnesota

References

Lakes of Minnesota
Lakes of Mille Lacs County, Minnesota